Vokzalna may mean:
 Vokzalna (Kyiv Metro), a station on the Kyiv Metro.
 Vokzalna (Dnipropetrovsk Metro), a station on the Dnipropetrovsk Metro.